Dustabad (also Romanized as Dūstābād) is a village in Harirud Rural District, Bujgan District, Torbat-e Jam County, Razavi Khorasan Province, Iran. At the 2006 census, its population was 58, in 10 families.

References 

Populated places in Torbat-e Jam County